Wincoma is a hamlet in on the westernmost headland of East Neck in the Town of Huntington, in Suffolk County, on the North Shore of Long Island, in New York, United States. 

The hamlet survives within the Village of Huntington Bay in the Town of Huntington. Wincoma is an estate-heavy enclave and many maps denote it to this day because of its importance in literature and media of the Gilded Age. Access to Wincoma Beach is restricted and available only to residents and their guests.

References

External links
Wincoma, New York (NY Hometown Locator) 
Bay Street Enters Wincoma, New York from Huntington Bay, New York (Google Street View)

Hamlets in New York (state)
Hamlets in Suffolk County, New York
Populated coastal places in New York (state)

vo:Huntington (New York)